Shawn-Claud Nicholas Lawson (born 13 January 1994) is a professional footballer who plays as a forward for Simcoe County Rovers in League1 Ontario. Born in Canada, he represented Jamaica at youth international level.

Early life
Lawson was born in Scarborough, Ontario, the son of former Jamaican national team player Jimmy Lawson. As an infant, he had an open heart surgery after the doctors had discovered a leaking valve. Lawson started playing youth soccer at the age of three with Ajax SC. He briefly played for North Scarborough SC and also trained with Dutch club Feyenoord's academy in 2006 and 2007. He later played for Pickering FC, where he was invited to attend trainings with English clubs Luton Town and Birmingham FC after attending a soccer camp led by Canadian national team player Paul Peschisolido. He was part of the U15 Ontario provincial program. Afterwards, he returned to Ajax SC helping lead them to the 2011 U18 Canadian national youth championship, in which he scored the game-winning goal.

College career
In 2012, he began attending Oakland University, playing for the Oakland Golden Grizzlies on a scholarship, after having interest from Clemson, North Carolina, Bucknell, Harvard, Colgate, Michigan, and the University of Cincinnati. He scored 8 goals in 78 appearances and won back-to-back Horizon League titles in 2014 and 2015.

Club career
In 2013, during the college off-season, he joined NPSL club Detroit City FC. He played 19 total matches between 2013 and 2014. He scored the 2014 NPSL Goal of the Year.

In 2015, he joined PDL club Des Moines Menace, scoring his first goal and collecting his first assist on June 26 against the Springfield Synergy FC.

In 2016, he played for NPSL club Michigan Stars FC.

For the 2017 season, he re-joined Detroit City, leading them in scoring in 2017 with nine goals, also winning the NPSA Northwest Region Championship in 2017. He led the team in scoring in 2018 once again with eight goals. He also had a training stint with USL club Ottawa Fury FC in 2018.

In late 2018, Lawson played for League1 Ontario side Darby FC, making three appearances in August and September of that year.

He returned to Detroit City in 2019. On July 7, he scored a hat trick in a 3-1 victory over AFC Ann Arbor. He scored another hat trick on August 6 in the club's annual cross-border exhibition against Canadian club Windsor TFC. In 2019, he set the club record with 19 goals in a single season, being named the DCFC Black Arrow Award winner as team MVP. With the club, he won the NISA Fall Tournament Championship. He departed the club after the 2020 season as the club's all-time leading scorer with 51 goals across all competitions. 

On 29 April 2021, Lawson returned to Canada, signing with Canadian Premier League side Atlético Ottawa. After the season, Ottawa elected not to exercise its contract option on Lawson.

In February 2022, Lawson signed with Simcoe County Rovers of League1 Ontario. He scored six goals, appearing in all 21 of the team's regular season matches and two playoff appearances.

International career
He first joined the Jamaica in 2010, later playing for them at the 2011 CONCACAF U-17 Championship, making two appearances in the group stage against Trinidad and Tobago and Guatemala, and a third appearance in the third-place match against the Panama. He was subsequently called up for the 2011 FIFA U-17 World Cup, where he made one appearance against Japan.

References

External links

1994 births
Living people
Association football forwards
Canadian soccer players
Jamaican footballers
Soccer players from Toronto
Sportspeople from Scarborough, Toronto
Canadian people of Jamaican descent
Canadian expatriate soccer players
Jamaican expatriate footballers
Expatriate soccer players in the United States
Canadian expatriate sportspeople in the United States
Jamaican expatriate sportspeople in the United States
Oakland Golden Grizzlies men's soccer players
Detroit City FC players
Des Moines Menace players
Michigan Stars FC players
Darby FC players
Atlético Ottawa players
National Premier Soccer League players
USL League Two players
League1 Ontario players
National Independent Soccer Association players
Canadian Premier League players
Jamaica youth international footballers
Simcoe County Rovers FC players